John Perdue Gray (August 6, 1825, Halfmoon Township (Pennsylvania) - November 29, 1886, Utica, New York) was an American psychiatrist at the forefront of biological psychiatric theory during the 19th century.

He attended Dickinson College, then the University of Pennsylvania School of Medicine, where he received his medical diploma in 1848. He spent on year of further studies in Europe, then is a resident at Blockley Asylum in Philadelphia. In 1850, Gray works in Utica Psychiatric Center in New York and  superintendent in 1854, until his death in 1886. He was also the editor of the American Journal of Insanity, the precursor to the American Journal of Psychiatry.

He was an psychiatric expert in the trial for the assassination of president James A. Garfield

Gray believed that insanity was always due to physical causes and that the mentally ill should be treated as physically ill. He explained that mental illness can be affected by physical factors relating to an individual. He studied three such factors, namely: diet, temperature and ventilation.

Works
Gray, John P. General Paresis, or Incomplete Progressive Paralysis. Albany, NY: Van Benthuysen, 1866.

Gray, John P. Insanity, its Dependence on Physical Disease. Utica, NY: Roberts, 1871.
https://archive.org/details/insanityitsdepen00gray

Gray, John P. Insanity: its Frequency and Some of its Preventable Causes. Utica, NY, 1886.

Gray, John P. The United States vs. Charles J. Guiteau, Indicted for Murder of James A. Garfield, Twentieth President of the United States. Opinion of … on the Sanity of the Prisoner. Washington, 1882.

References

 
 Death of Dr. John P. Gray, Nov 29, 1886, New York Times.
 Robert J. Waldinger, Sleep of Reason: John P. Gray and the Challenge of Moral Insanity, J Hist Med Allied Sci (1979) XXXIV (2): 163–179. 
 Bio, 19th-Century Psychiatrists of Note, www.nlm.nih.gov
 Obituary, Br Med J. 1886 December 4; 2(1353): 1124–1125.
 John P. Gray, M.D., 1825-1886, APA Presidents Biographical Sketches : 11 1883-1884 Gray, John P., American Psychiatric Association
 Allen D. Spiegel and Florence Kavaler, The Differing Views on Insanity of Two Nineteenth Century Forensic Psychiatrists, Journal of Community Health, Volume 31, Number 5, 430–451, 
 Rosenberg, Charles E.  The Trial of the Assassin Guiteau: Psychiatry and Law in the Gilded Age.  Chicago: Univ. of Chicago, 1968.
 Fullinwider, S.P.  “Insanity as the Loss of Self: The Moral Insanity Controversy Revisited,” Bulletin of the History of Medicine, 49(1) (1975): 87-101.
 Ozarin, Lucy D.  “The Guiteau Trial: Battle of the Forensic Experts,” Psychiatric News 30(9) (1995).

American psychiatrists
Dickinson College alumni
University of Pennsylvania alumni
The American Journal of Psychiatry editors

1825 births
1886 deaths